Taunton Deane was a local government district with borough status in Somerset, England. It merged with West Somerset to form Somerset West and Taunton on 1 April 2019. Its council was based in Taunton. The district was formed on 1 April 1974, under the Local Government Act 1972, by a merger of the Municipal Borough of Taunton, Wellington Urban District, Taunton Rural District, and Wellington Rural District. Taunton Deane was granted borough status in 1975, enabling the mayoralty of Taunton to be continued, when other districts did not have mayors. The district was given the name of an alternate form of the Taunton Deane Hundred.

A scheduled monument is a nationally important archaeological site or monument which is given legal protection by being placed on a list (or "schedule") by the Secretary of State for Digital, Culture, Media and Sport; English Heritage takes the leading role in identifying such sites.  The legislation governing this is the Ancient Monuments and Archaeological Areas Act 1979.  The term "monument" can apply to the whole range of archaeological sites, and they are not always visible above ground. Such sites have to have been deliberately constructed by human activity.  They range from prehistoric standing stones and burial sites, through Roman remains and Medieval structures such as castles and monasteries, to later structures such as industrial sites and buildings constructed for the World Wars or the Cold War.

There are 33 scheduled monuments in Taunton Deane. Many of them are Neolithic through to the Bronze and Iron Ages such as bowl barrows, cairns along with hill forts such as Norton Camp. Castle Neroche was an Iron Age hill fort which was reused as a Norman motte-and-bailey castle. Burrow Mump shows evidence of Roman use but is better known as a Norman motte-and-bailey castle, and later church. It was presented, in 1946, by Major Alexander Gould Barrett, to the National Trust to serve as a memorial to the 11,281 Somerset men who lost their lives during the first and second world wars.

The Medieval period is represented by several churchyard crosses. The defensive walls and part of Taunton Castle, which has Anglo-Saxon origins and was expanded during the Medieval and Tudor eras, is included. More recent sites include Poundisford Park, Buckland Priory, Bradford Bridge and a duck decoy from the 17th century. Some of the sites such as Balt Moor Wall are of uncertain date; however the most recent are air traffic control buildings, pillboxes and fighter pens from RAF Culmhead, situated at Churchstanton on the Blackdown Hills. The monuments are listed below using the titles given in the English Heritage data sheets.

Monuments

|}

See also
 Scheduled Monuments in Somerset
 Grade I listed buildings in Taunton Deane
 Grade II* listed buildings in Taunton Deane

Notes

References

List
Archaeological sites in Somerset
History of Somerset
Scheduled
Taunton Deane